The Ringmoor settlement is an Iron Age/Romano-British farming settlement in Dorset, England. It is between the villages of Okeford Fitzpaine and Turnworth, and lies on east-facing slopes of Bell Hill, on the Dorset Downs.

The site is owned by the National Trust, and is a Scheduled Ancient Monument.

Earthworks
The site is well preserved in unploughed downland. Outside the enclosure, trackways and field systems are still clearly visible as banks in the grassland.

More recent occupation

Ringmoor Cottages, built in the mid 19th century, once stood on the site, but they were vacated and demolished in the early 1950s.

References

History of Dorset
Scheduled monuments in Dorset
Former populated places in Dorset
National Trust properties in Dorset